José Eleonildo Soares, better known as Pinto Itamaraty (born May 10, 1960 in São Luís) is a Brazilian politician. He was alderman (2001–2007) and federal deputy (2007–2015). Itamaraty is senator from Maranhão.

References 

Living people
1960 births
People from São Luís, Maranhão
Republicans (Brazil) politicians
Brazilian Social Democracy Party politicians
Brazilian Labour Party (current) politicians
Members of the Chamber of Deputies (Brazil) from Maranhão
Members of the Legislative Assembly of Maranhão